Wildbach is a German television series.

See also
List of German television series

External links
 

1993 German television series debuts
1997 German television series endings
Television shows set in Bavaria
German-language television shows
Das Erste original programming